Good Thang is the second album by American funk band Faze-O, released in 1978.

Track listing
  Good Thang - 7:38  
  Who Loves You - 12:20  
  Space People - 4:31
  Party Time - 5:10
  Love Me Girl - 5:05
  Funky Lady - 5:55

Personnel
Keith Harrison - Vocals, ARP & Minimoog synths, Clavinet, Acoustic and Fender Rhodes electric piano, percussion
Ralph "Love" Aikens, Jr. - Lead Guitar, Talk Box, Lead and Backing Vocals 	
Frederick Tyrone Crum - Bass
Robert Neal, Jr. - Percussion, Lead and Backing Vocals
Roger Parker - Drums, Percussion 
Eddie "Bongo" Brown - Bongos
Allejo Poveda - Latin Percussion
Billy Beck - Keyboards
Clarence "Satch" Satchell - Tenor Saxophone, Trumpet 
Jack Kramer - Trumpet
Clarence Willis - Rhythm Guitar

References

1978 albums
Faze-O albums
Atlantic Records albums